The S6 service of the S-Bahn Rhein-Main system bearing the KBS (German scheduled railway route) number 645.6

Routes

Main-Weser Railway

City tunnel 

The city tunnel is an underground, pure S-Bahn route used by almost all services (except for the S7 service which terminates at the central station). In a short section between Mühlberg and Offenbach-Kaiserlei the South Main railway is used.

History 

The S6 was one of the first six services of the Rhine-Main S-Bahn system. In a prior test operation it ran between Kronberg and Frankfurt Central Station. The service was then called R6 where the letter "R" stands for regional. After the opening of the Frankfurt Citytunnel the service was renamed to S6 and extended to the new Hauptwache underground station. Further extensions of the tunnel followed in 1983 (Konstablerwache) and 1990 (Ostendstraße and Lokalbahnhof) so that Stresemannallee became the service's eastern terminal.

Operation 
 Friedberg – Frankfurt Süd
 Groß-Karben – Frankfurt Süd

External links 

traffiQ Frankfurt – S6 timetable
Construction work information of Deutsche Bahn 

Rhine-Main S-Bahn